Miss Grand Sri Lanka is an annual female beauty pageant in Sri Lanka, founded in 2016 by a Colombo-based designer and event organizer Brian Kerkoven, aiming to select the country representative to compete in its parent contest Miss Grand International. The contest was held twice in 2016 and 2018, after that the Sri Lankan candidates at Miss Grand International were appointed instead.

Since its first participation at Miss Grand International in 2013, Sri Lanka representatives have never won the contest but got placements four times including the top 10 finalists in 2013 and 2015, and the top 20 finalists in 2014 and 2018.

History
Sri Lanka made its debutante at Miss Grand International in 2013 with the top 10 finalists placement by a 24 years-old Colombo-based model Dannielle Kerkoven. Under the directorship of Brian Kerkoven, who has served as the licensee of Miss Grand Sri Lanka since 2013, the inaugural edition of the Miss Grand national contest was held in 2016 at Taj Samudra Hotel in Colombo, featuring ten national delegates, which a senior business student Harshani Ruman was named the winner, the following edition of the contest was held in 2018, both editions were broadcast on a Sri Lankan state governed television channel Independent Television Network (ITN). However, due to a newly established national pageant, Miss & Mister Sri Lanka was founded in 2019 by Brian Kerkoven as the replacement contest, and no Miss Grand national contest has additionally been held, the country representatives at Miss Grand International were instead appointed since then.

Editions
The following list is the competition details of the Miss Grand Sri Lanka pageant since its inception in 2016.

International competition
The main finalists of the Miss Grand Sri Lanka pageant have been sent to represent the country in various international contests, the following is a list of international contests, with participants from Miss Grand Sri Lanka as contestants based on the year the pageant was held, the competition results included.

Gallery

References

External links

 

Sri Lanka
Recurring events established in 2016
Grand Sri Lanka